Thomas Meaney (11 August 1931 – 26 December 2022) was an Irish Fianna Fáil politician who served as a Minister of State from 1980 to 1981. He served as a Teachta Dála (TD) from 1965 to 1981. 

Before entering politics Meaney worked as a farmer. His father Con Meaney was also a Fianna Fáil TD. When his father retired at the 1965 general election, Tom Meaney succeeded him as the Fianna Fáil TD for the Cork Mid constituency. He was re-elected at every subsequent general election until his retirement from politics at the November 1982 general election. In March 1980, he was appointed Minister of State at the Department of Industry, Commerce and Energy, serving until June 1981.

He was a member of Cork County Council from 1970 to 1977. He was part of a group of Fianna Fáil TDs known as the Gang of 22, who opposed the leadership of Charles Haughey in the early 1980s.

Meaney died on 26 December 2022, at the age of 91.

See also
Families in the Oireachtas

Sources

References

1931 births
2022 deaths
Fianna Fáil TDs
Members of the 18th Dáil
Members of the 19th Dáil
Members of the 20th Dáil
Members of the 21st Dáil
Members of the 22nd Dáil
Members of the 23rd Dáil
Politicians from County Cork
Irish farmers
Ministers of State of the 21st Dáil